Lillia Camille King (born February 10, 1997) is an American swimmer who specializes in breaststroke. She currently represents the Cali Condors, a team that is part of the International Swimming League. At the 2016 Summer Olympics, she won the gold medal in the 100-meter breaststroke competition and also won a gold medal in the 4x100 meter medley relay, in which she swam the breaststroke leg. At the 2020 Summer Olympics, King won a silver medal in the 4x100 meter medley relay for her efforts in the prelims, the silver medal in the 200-meter breaststroke, and the bronze medal in the 100-meter breaststroke. She is the current world record holder in the long course 100-meter breaststroke.

Early life
King was born and raised in Evansville, Indiana, the daughter of Mark and Ginny King. Mark ran track and cross-country at Indiana State University, and Ginny swam for Eastern Kentucky University and Illinois State University. King's younger brother Alex is a walk-on swimmer at the University of Michigan. King attended FJ Reitz High School, where the school's swim team shared Lloyd Pool with five other teams. The lanes at Lloyd Pool were often overcrowded, preventing King from receiving the necessary workout she required to perform at her best competitive level, so to help compensate, King added several morning practices a week with the local masters team and joined a competitive swim team called the Newburgh Sea Creatures.

Career

Early career
To gain additional competition experience in her teenage years, King swam unattached at junior national championships, with one standout performance being placing 14 spots and 1.20 seconds ahead of Meghan Dressel in the 200-yard breaststroke at the 2012 Winter Junior National Championships. As a 17-year-old at the 2014 Junior Pan Pacific Swimming Championships, held in Hawaii, she won gold medals in the 100 meter breaststroke with a Championships record time of 1:07.98, and the 4×100 meter medley relay with a Championships record of 4:03.44, and placed fourth in the 200 meter breaststroke with a time of 2:29.83.

College
King attended Indiana University Bloomington, where she competed for the Indiana Hoosiers swimming and diving team.

At the NCAA Women's Division I Swimming and Diving Championships during her first year, she was the NCAA Champion in the 100 yard breaststroke (56.85) and 200 yard breaststroke (2:03.59). The performance established King as one of the best short course yards breaststroke swimmers in history, setting the American, NCAA, NCAA Meet, U.S. Open, Indiana school, Big Ten, and Georgia Tech Pool records in winning the NCAA titles. That same first year she was named the Big Ten Swimmer of the Year, earned four All-America honors, First-Team All-Big Ten, and Big Ten Freshman of the Year. King continued her elite success by claiming the 100 yard breaststroke and 200 yard breaststroke titles throughout her collegiate career and was only the 2nd woman ever to sweep the two events for all four years. As a senior, she won the Honda Sports Award as the nation's best female swimmer.

2016 Summer Olympics

At the 2016 US Olympic trials in Omaha, King won both the 100 meter breaststroke and the 200 meter breaststroke, qualifying for the 2016 Summer Olympics in Rio de Janeiro.

In the 100-meter breaststroke heats, King finished first with a time of 1:05.78 and qualified for the semifinals. There she again finished first with a time of 1:05.70. The next fastest swimmer was Yuliya Yefimova from Russia, the reigning world champion who had previously served a 16-month doping suspension for failing a 2013 drug test. Yefimova also failed a drug test in 2016, but with no research on how long the drug stayed in a person's system, she was not banned or given a suspension. As King looked on from the ready room, where swimmers gather before they race, Yefimova won her semifinal and wagged her index finger. After posting the fastest time in the 100 m breaststroke semifinals, King expressed distaste. In a post-race interview with NBC and reported on by The New York Times, King said, "You wave your finger No. 1 and you've been caught drug cheating? I'm not a fan." King went on to win the Olympic gold medal in the 100-meter breaststroke, setting an Olympic record of 1:04.93 in the process.

In the 200-meter breaststroke heats, King finished 15th with a time of 2:25.89 and qualified for the semifinals. She finished 7th in her semifinal with a time of 2:24.59. She did not qualify for the final. Charlotte Wilder of USA Today said King and Yefimova's rivalry "was heightened by the backstory, the international rivalry, and the high stakes of a final event. It was the Olympics at its very, very best." Mike Decourcy and Tom Gatto of Sporting News noted the two swimmers "joined the list of the hottest U.S.-Soviet/Russian head-to-heads in sports history." As a result of her approach to the 2016 Summer Olympics and her rivalry with Yefimova, Pat Forde of Yahoo! Sports said King developed a reputation as being "friendly but fiery, with no filter and no apologies." Journalists from The Washington Post and the Associated Press criticized King's treatment of Yefimova.

2017 World Championships

At the 2017 US Nationals, the qualification meet for the World Aquatics Championships in Budapest, King swept the breaststroke events. She won the 50-meter breaststroke with a time of 29.66, the 100-meter breaststroke with 1:04.95, and the 200-meter breaststroke with 2:21.83.

In her first event at the 2017 World Championships, King won the 100-meter breaststroke with a world record time of 1:04.13. King's American teammate Katie Meili finished second and Yulia Efimova touched third. The race was highly anticipated because Efimova had nearly broken the former world record and mockingly wagged her finger during the semifinal.

2018
At the 2018 US Nationals, the qualification meet for the World Aquatics Championships in  Gwangju, King won two of three breaststroke events. She dominated the 50-meter breaststroke with a time of 29.82 and the 100-meter breaststroke in 1:05.36. King also placed 5th in the 200-meter breaststroke (2:25.31).

2018 Pan Pacific Championships
King competed in a total of three events at the 2018 Pan Pacific Championships held in Tokyo, Japan, in August 2018. She won gold in the 100-meter breaststroke with a time of 1:05.44. In her other two events, she won silver medals, swimming a 2:22.12 in the 200-meter breaststroke and splitting a 1:04.86 on the breaststroke leg of the 4x100-meter medley relay.

2019

2019 World Championships

In her first event at the 2019 World Championships, King won the 100-meter breaststroke in a time of 1:04.93. She also won the 50-meter breaststroke easily with a 29.84. In the 200-meter breaststroke, King was disqualified in the prelims heats for not touching the wall simultaneously with both hands on one of her turns. King swam the breaststroke leg of the 4x100-meter mixed medley relay with Ryan Murphy swimming backstroke, Caeleb Dressel swimming butterfly, and Simone Manuel swimming freestyle. She was the only female swimmer to swim the breaststroke leg of the mixed relay out of all eight relays in the final. The relay finished second, two-hundredths of a second behind the Australian relay team, taking silver in the event. Lastly, King was a part of the world record-breaking 4x100-meter medley relay with Regan Smith, Kelsi Dahlia, and Simone Manuel in a time of 3:50.40.

International Swimming League
In 2019 she was a member of the inaugural International Swimming League representing the Cali Condors, who finished third place in the final match in Las Vegas, Nevada, in December. King was the only swimmer in the league to go undefeated in multiple matches, winning all 16 events she participated in throughout the season.

2021

2020 US Olympic Trials
On the second day of the 2020 US Olympic Trials (delayed to June 2021 due to the COVID-19 pandemic), June 14, 2021, King set a Championship Record in the semifinals of the 100-meter breaststroke swimming a 1:04.72. Her time was also the fastest among women globally in the long course 100-meter breaststroke for the year up to that point in 2021. In the final for the 100-meter breaststroke the evening of the next day of competition, day three, King finished first with a time of 1:04.79, less than a second ahead of second place finisher Lydia Jacoby, and qualified for the 2020 Summer Olympics in the event. This was King's second time making a US Olympic Team. In her post-win interview for the 100-meter breaststroke on the NBC telecast covering day three of the US Olympic Trials in swimming, King expressed excitement about getting to call herself a two-time Olympian.

In the prelims for the 200-meter breaststroke on day five of competition, King ranked third, swimming a 2:25.82 and advancing to the semifinals. She swam a 2:22.73 in the semifinals, ranking first, and advancing to the final. In the final, King swam a 2:21.75, finishing in second place and qualifying for the 2020 Summer Olympics in the event.

2020 Summer Olympics

Leading up to the 2020 Olympic Games, King spearheaded the topic of cheaters at the Games in the press as early as June, wagging her finger metaphorically before the start of competition to let the other swimmers know how she felt in advance if they cheated.

At the 2020 Summer Olympics in Tokyo, Japan, King swam the third fastest time overall in the prelims of the 100-meter breaststroke and advanced to the semifinals. King advanced to the final with her swim of 1:05.40 in the semifinals, ranking second overall. In the final, King won the bronze medal with a time of 1:05.54, less than a second behind the first-place finisher, American Lydia Jacoby, who swam a 1:04.95. After the race, King said "We love to keep that gold in the USA family... This kid just had the swim of her life and I'm so proud to be her teammate and win bronze for my country."

On day five of competition, King swam a 2:22.10 in her prelims heat of the 200-meter breaststroke, qualifying for the semifinals ranking second overall behind South African Tatjana Schoenmaker. In the semifinals of the event on day six of competition, King qualified for the final, ranking second in her semifinal heat and fifth overall with her time of 2:22:27. In the final of the 200-meter breaststroke, King won the silver medal with a personal best time of 2:19.92.

In the prelims of the 4x100-medley relay, King swam the breaststroke leg of the relay, splitting a 1:05.51 and helped advance the relay to the final ranked second. The finals relay placed second, and King won a silver medal for her efforts along with the other swimmers on the prelims relay and the finals relay.

International Swimming League
Team Cali Condors selected King to compete for them as part of the 2021 International Swimming League. In the final match of the year, King won the 200 meter breaststroke with a time of 2:17.06, placed second in the 50 meter breaststroke, and was disqualified in the 4x100 meter medley relay for not toughing the wall simultaneously with both of her hands on the breaststroke leg of the relay. The second day of final match competition, King won the 100 meter breaststroke with a time of 1:03.75 and earned 10 points for her team. In the 4x100 meter mixed medley relay, King helped earn another 8 points for her team with relay teammates Justin Ress, Caeleb Dressel, and Natalie Hinds by achieving a fifth place finish. Swimming news agency Swimming World declared King and her disqualification in the 4x100 meter mixed medley relay as the sole reason the Cali Condors lost to Energy Standard in the final match. At the end of the 2021 season, when most valuable player points were summed for all competitors from every match since the start of the International Swimming League in 2019, King ranked third out of 488 competitors with 832 points, trailing the top-ranked competitor Sarah Sjöström by less than 200 points.

Honors
 On September 11, 2018, the city of Evansville approved the new Deaconess Aquatic Center, which the facility's competition pool is named in honor of King, who personally pushed for the project.
 2019—Honda Sports Award - Swimming & Diving
 SwimSwam Top 100 (Women's): 2021 (#4), 2022 (#12)

Personal best times

Long course meters (50 m pool)

Short course meters (25 m pool)

Short course yards (25 yd pool)

World records

Long course meters

Personal

Following her win of a silver medal in the 200-meter breaststroke at the 2020 Summer Olympics, King expressed her frustration concerning the negative treatment of athletes who won a medal other than gold by some Americans.

See also
 List of Olympic medalists in swimming (women)
 List of world records in swimming
 World record progression 50 metres breaststroke
 World record progression 100 metres breaststroke

References

External links
 
 
 
 
 
 

1997 births
Living people
American female breaststroke swimmers
Indiana Hoosiers women's swimmers
Swimmers at the 2016 Summer Olympics
Swimmers at the 2020 Summer Olympics
Sportspeople from Evansville, Indiana
Swimmers from Indiana
Olympic gold medalists for the United States in swimming
Olympic bronze medalists for the United States in swimming
Medalists at the 2016 Summer Olympics
Medalists at the 2020 Summer Olympics
Medalists at the FINA World Swimming Championships (25 m)
Universiade medalists in swimming
World Aquatics Championships medalists in swimming
World record holders in swimming
Universiade silver medalists for the United States
Universiade bronze medalists for the United States
Medalists at the 2015 Summer Universiade
Big Ten Athlete of the Year winners
Olympic silver medalists for the United States in swimming
21st-century American women